Lei, gli amici e tutto il resto (She, friends and everything else), is the fourth studio album by Italian singer-songwriter Nek. It was released in 1996, as his first studio album with Warner Music Group. It was re-released on 1 March 1997, after the success of the single "Laura non c'è", which had not been included in the album.

Since 1999 there have been reported sales of over 2 million copies all over the world.

Track listing

Musicians
 Nek – vocals, backing vocals, acoustic guitar
 Mario Flores – Hammond organ
 Massimo Barbari – piano
 Walter Sacripanti – drums
 Angelo Torelli – harmonica
 Rossano Eleuteri – bass
 Luca Tosoni – piano, keyboards
 Massimo Varini – guitar, backing vocals, keyboards

Charts and certifications

Peak positions

Year-end charts

Certifications and sales

Reception
allmusic

References

1996 albums
Nek albums